Hochschild is a surname. Notable people with the surname include:

 Adam Hochschild (born 1942), American writer; grandson of Berthold and son of Harold K.; husband of Arlie Russell 
 Arlie Russell Hochschild, American sociologist; wife of Adam
 Berthold Hochschild (1860–1928), German-born American businessman; father of Harold K.
 Eduardo Hochschild (born c. 1963), Peruvian billionaire businessman
 Gerhard Hochschild (1915-2010), American mathematician
 Harold K. Hochschild (1892–1981), American businessman; son of Berthold, brother of Walter; and father of Adam
 Mauricio Hochschild (1881–1965), Bolivian tin baron
 Sali Hochschild (1883-1965), Chilean businessman
 Walter Hochschild (1901–1983), American businessman
 Zachary Hochschild (1854–1912), German businessman

See also
 In mathematics, the Hochschild homology